Kothao Keu Nei (Bengali: কোথাও কেউ নেই, English: No one is nowhere) is a Bangladeshi drama television series written by Humayun Ahmed, which aired on Bangladesh Television from 1993 to 1994. The series is about the struggles of a gangster named Baker Bhai.It was adapted from the book of the same name.

Kothao Keu Nei gained intense popularity, mainly due to the lovable rogue Baker Bhai, who grew into one of the beloved fictional characters in Bangladesh. It is considered one of the best tv-series Humayun Ahmed ever created and a house staple of every Bangladeshi in the 90's cable-tv era. The series had a huge impact on the fans that they started protesting on the streets after the death of the main character (Baker Bhai) was unjustified.

Plot 
 
The central character of the series was "Baker Bhai". He was a gangster, and his companions were "Badi" and "Majnu"; all three used to travel on motorcycles. Most of the time, Majnu drove the motorcycle, Badi sat behind, Baker Bhai sat in the middle. Baker Bhai had a penchant for twisting a chain over and over on his index finger, turning it around, unfastening it, and refastening it. He was often seen doing this when there was no active dialogue. Baker Bhai liked 'Muna.' Muna is a girl from a lower-middle-class family. She works and takes care of her cousins. And she had a love affair with an unemployed youth named Mamun. Even though Baker Bhai was the gangster of the area, most of the people loved him because he was a worshiper of truth - he did not hesitate to stand by the side of oppressed people, as well as he did not accept the injustice of the society with his face, he suppressed it with his goons. In the course of events, Baker Bhai conflicts with an influential woman in the area named Rebecca Haque. The woman indulged in illegal activities in her house; Baker Bhai protested after finding out. Baker Bhai called her 'Kuttawali' because this powerful woman used to keep dogs in her house. In the meantime, the gatekeeper of Rebecca Haque was murdered in his house in the dark of night. Baker Bhai is blamed for the murder, and newly-arranged witness of Rebecca Haque, Moti, the new robber of the area, testifies as a witness. Although Baker Bhai's lawyer was handing over Moti's false testimony to the court, in the meantime, Rebecca Haque got hold of Baker Bhai's partner Badi by showing greed to frame Baker Bhai. Badi becomes desperate and subtly frames Baker Bhai by swearing false testimony in court. The court sentenced Baker Bhai, innocent of the murder, to death based on false testimony. The lawyer tried until the last moment to advocate for Baker Bhai but failed. Muna was devastated by this decision of the court.

Meanwhile, everyone in Muna's house also migrated to different places. On this solitary day, early one morning, in the semi-darkness, The police took Baker Bhai's body out through the prison gate while the Fajr call was being sounded all around. There was no one to accept the body except Muna. After the cremation, Muna grew up alone. As if he had no one left anywhere. Living up to the play's name, Muna stands alone in the wilderness in the series's last scene; the dawn's light is a shadow in the darkness.

Cultural impact 
After the unjustified death of the Protagonist, Protests broke out everywhere; fans brought demonstrations.

Letters and petitions urged Ahmed not to kill off Baker Bhai. But Ahmed stuck to his storyline, and Baker Bhai was hanged. For years afterward, special prayers were held in many localities to pray for the departed soul of this fictional character.

Ahmed was quite perturbed by this public agitation over Baker Bhai's hanging.

''So many people are hanged for no good reason, so many people die by the roadside and there is hardly any public headache over these. Yet, here was a fictional character being hanged and the public are up in arms. I was quite taken aback by all this," Humayun Ahmed told the BBC.

Cast

References

External links

1990s Bangladeshi drama television series
1990 Bangladeshi television series debuts
1990s Bangladeshi television series
Bangladeshi drama television series
Bengali-language television programming in Bangladesh
Bangladesh Television original programming